Chad Broskey (born July 3, 1987) is an American actor. He has played in two movies, Legally Blondes (2009), and Read It and Weep (2006).

Early life
Chad went to the Youth Performing Arts School in Louisville, Kentucky.

Career
He appeared as Gavin in an episode for The Suite Life of Zack & Cody. He also co-starred in the Disney Channel Original Movie Read It and Weep opposite Kay Panabaker as Marco Vega and appeared in the Scrubs episode Their Story as The Todd's fantasy son Rod.  Chad appeared in an episode of Wizards of Waverly Place as one of the football players that helps Justin take down The Answer Man. His last movie was Legally Blondes.

Personal life
Broskey is openly gay.

Filmography

External links

Chad Broskey's Heyman Talent Agency Profile

1987 births
American male television actors
Living people
Male actors from Louisville, Kentucky
DuPont Manual High School alumni